Eupithecia elissa is a moth in the family Geometridae first described by Karl Dietze in 1910. It is found in Tunisia.

References

Moths described in 1910
elissa
Moths of Africa